Federal Peronism, also known as Dissident Peronism and Menemism, are the informal names given to a conservative political alliance between Justicialist Party figures, currently identified mostly by its opposition to ruling Kirchnerism, the left-wing faction.

The term "Federal Peronism," as opposed to "metropolitan Peronism" (mainly from Greater Buenos Aires), was informally used since the 1980s to identify the more traditional and conservative Peronists from the Provinces of Argentina, whose governors grew in number and influence during the administration of President Carlos Menem.

"Dissident Peronism" is more properly used to refer to the Peronist opposition to the administrations and party leadership of left-leaning Néstor Kirchner and Cristina Fernández de Kirchner. The term gained currency since the 2008 Argentine government conflict with the agricultural sector, when a number of party leaders, governors and legislators (mainly from the agroexporter provinces) withdrew their support of the national government.

Overview
Following the crisis that precipitated the resignation of President Fernando de la Rúa on December 21, 2001, the opposition Justicialist Party won a majority in both houses of the Argentine Congress in the October 2001 mid-term elections. The first interim President of Argentina elected by Congress after de la Rúa's resignation, San Luis Province Senator Adolfo Rodríguez Saá, had the support of a group of governors and legislators from the hinterland provinces, from where the informal designation of Federal Peronism originated. He resigned a week later, however, after failing to gain support from other factions of Peronism, from organized labor, and other sectors of Argentine society. The former Governor of Buenos Aires Province and runner-up in the 1999 general election, Eduardo Duhalde was elected by the Congress as interim President of Argentina on January 2, 2002.

Eduardo Duhalde, who counted on the support of Buenos Aires Province Peronism and some labor union leaders, called elections for April 2003, and persuaded the fractious Justicialist Party to present candidates directly to the general elections, without party primaries. After attempting to endorse other candidates (Carlos Reutemann, who refused to run, and José Manuel de la Sota, who did badly at the polls), Duhalde threw his support behind the little-known Governor of Santa Cruz Province, Néstor Kirchner. Federal Peronists, in turn, were represented in the elections by two factions, one headed by former President Carlos Menem and Governor of Salta Province José Luis Romero, identified with the policies spoused by Menem's 1989-99 presidency, and the other by Adolfo Rodríguez Saá and his brother, Alberto Rodríguez Saá, in an alliance with Radical Civic Union lawmaker Melchor Posse. Menem and Kirchner emerged as the runoff candidates, but the former President withdrew on May 14 as he anticipated a landslide defeat (the polls favored Kirchner 70%–30%), and Kirchner became the president-elect.

2005
The alliance between President Kirchner and Duhalde had been dissolved by the 2005 mid-term elections. Kirchner and Duhalde fielded their respective wives (each an influential lawmaker in her own right), Cristina Fernández de Kirchner and Hilda González de Duhalde, as leaders of their party lists in Buenos Aires Province (the nation's largest constituency). The landslide victory of the Kirchners' FpV consolidated their leadership role in the Justicialist Party, and this in turn forced Duhalde to break with the official Peronist body, the Justicialist Party, in which Kirchnerism had become the dominant force. He thus established Federal Peronism on November 4, 2005, and gathered a caucus of 25 Congressmen in its support.

2007
They later backed Alberto Rodríguez Saá's conservative Peronist candidacy in the 2007 presidential elections, where Mrs. Kirchner was elected to succeed her husband with 45% of the vote (twice that of the runner-up, and six times that of Rodríguez Saá).

Dissident Peronism was united by its opposition to Kirchner's Front for Victory (FpV), which became the leading vehicle for left-wing Peronists and incorporated much of the official Peronist structure. Among the early leaders in Dissident Peronism also included Misiones Province Senator Ramón Puerta, Buenos Aires Province Congressman Carlos Ruckauf, and union leader Luis Barrionuevo. Barrionuevo, unlike most members of the CGT, was allied with Menem, who arguably remained the most prominent spokesman for neo-liberal policies in Argentina.

2009
The 2008 Argentine government conflict with the agricultural sector over a proposed rise in export tariffs led to a sharp drop in presidential approval ratings, and numerous FpV lawmakers from more agrarian provinces broke with the party. The defections, which included 16 Lower House members and 4 Senators, thus resulted in the reemergence of Federal Peronism. The conflict also prompted Luis Barrionuevo, whose alliance with Menem had cost him support in the CGT, to organize a splinter trade union confederation, the "Blue and White CGT," to challenge the center-left wing leadership of Secretary General Hugo Moyano, albeit unsuccessfully. A dissident Peronist who as an ally of Menem had never joined the FpV, businessman Francisco de Narváez, in turn formed an alliance with the center-right PRO in Buenos Aires Province and the city of Buenos Aires for the 2009 elections.

The elections resulted in a setback for the governing, center-left Front for Victory and its allies, which lost their absolute majorities in both houses of Congress. Former President Néstor Kirchner stood as head of the FpV party list in the important Buenos Aires Province. Kirchner's list was defeated, however, by the center-right PRO/Federal Peronism list headed by de Narváez; the loss in Buenos Aires Province, though narrow, was significant as the province had helped maintain Kirchnerism as the dominant force in Argentine politics since 2003.

Federal Peronism emerged from the 2009 mid-term elections with 45 Congressmen and 10 Senators, becoming the fourth and third-largest caucus in each house, respectively.

2011
The alliance began preparations for the 2011 elections by agreeing to a primary election for April 3, thereby uniting behind a single candidate. Among the candidates running in the Federal Peronist primary were: former President Eduardo Duhalde; Senators Adolfo Rodríguez Saá, Juan Carlos Romero, and Carlos Reutemann; Congressmen Felipe Solá and Francisco de Narváez; and Governor Mario Das Neves. An alliance with PRO was also actively considered;
 
Buenos Aires Mayor Mauricio Macri expressed unwillingness to accept a running mate from outside PRO ranks, but ultimately withdrew his bid for the presidency.

Trailing in the polls ahead of the 2011 elections, Federal Peronists remained divided between Duhalde's Popular Front and Alberto Rodríguez Saá's Federal Commitment even after the national August primaries, with Rodríguez Saá attracting upscale voters, and Duhalde, older, mainly working-class voters. They finished third and fourth place in the October general election with 8% and 6% of the total vote, respectively.

2013
Governor José Manuel de la Sota of Córdoba Province formally became a dissident Peronist in September 2012 by establishing a local Justicialist Party faction opposed to Kirchnerism.

2017
Between 2017 and 2019, Federal Peronism sought to consolidate itself as a third force other than the ruling party and Kirchnerism, bringing together several of its members in the Federal Alternative space, led by the Governor of Salta, Juan Manuel Urtubey, the Governor of Cordoba, Juan Schiaretti, the leader of the Renewal Front Sergio Massa, and the Senator for Río Negro, Miguel Ángel Pichetto. After several round trips, and the failure of negotiations between said space and the former Minister of Economy and presidential candidate Roberto Lavagna, Federal Alternative began to crack.

2019
In June 2019, the main references joined other parties: Miguel Ángel Pichetto, Adolfo Rodríguez Saá and Juan Carlos Romero joined Juntos por el Cambio; Sergio Massa allies joined the Frente de Todos and Juan Manuel Urtubey joined Federal Consensus. Carlos Menem sat in the Frente de Todos in the Senate.

Electoral history

Presidential elections

Congressional elections

Chamber of Deputies

Senate elections

References

2005 establishments in Argentina
Centre-right ideologies
Conservatism in Argentina
Justicialist Party
Liberal conservatism
National conservatism
Peronist parties and alliances in Argentina
Political parties in Argentina
Political party factions in Argentina
Political parties established in 2005